Carolina University of Theology or CUT was a private Christian university located in Manassas, Virginia, United States, and offered unaccredited theological degrees by distance learning. It is an affiliate and educational outreach ministry of 'Reconciliation Community Church' of the same locality.

Mission statement 
The mission of Carolina University of Theology is to provide continued educational programs to students who fall into two categories: (1) Those are unable to attend full-time classes on campus.  This can be accomplished through the University's home study/online programs.  (2) Those who are able to attend on campus classes twice a week.

History 
Carolina University of Theology was founded by Dr. Gene Thompson of Iron Station, North Carolina in 1990−91.
The "university" suspended all activities on April 25, 2022 citing lack of students and faculty members. However, this decision to close was 11 days after the University founder, John R. Payton, was arrested for alleged sexual abuse of a 20 year old woman in a "counseling session." This arrest occurred on the campus of CUT and Reconciliation Church.

Academic programs 
Carolina University of Theology offered the following unaccredited degree programs.
     
 Bachelor of Biblical Studies (BBS)
 Master of Christian Education (MCE)
 Master of Christian Counseling Psychology (MCCP) (Unaccredited)
 Master of Ministry (M.Min.)
 Master of Theology (MTH)
 Doctor of Christian Education (DCE)
 Doctor of Christian Counseling Psychology (DCCP) (Unaccredited) 
 Doctor of Ministry  (D.Min.)
 Doctor of Theology (Th.D.)

Accreditation 
Carolina University of Theology, In pursuant to 8 VAC 40-31-50 of the Virginia Administrative Code was granted religious exemption from the Commonwealth of Virginia State Council of Higher Education For Virginia/SCHEV's regulations and is authorized as a degree granting institution. Carolina University is unaccredited by any accreditation body recognized by CHEA or the USDE. Degrees from this school therefore lack utility in use for transfer to other university.

Notable alumni 
 Mel Tomlinson

References 

 www.cutofnova.org

External links 
 

Unaccredited Christian universities and colleges in the United States
Manassas, Virginia
1990 establishments in Virginia
Educational institutions established in 1990